Lymanske may refer to:

Places
Ukraine
 Lymanske, in the Rozdilna Raion of Odessa Oblast
 Lymanske, in the Pavlohrad Raion of Dnipropetrovsk Oblast
 Lymanske, in the Skadovsk Raion of Kherson Oblast
 Lymanske, in the Berezanka Raion of Mykolaiv Oblast
 Lymanske, in the Izmail Raion of Odessa Oblast
 Lymanske, in the Yakymivka Raion of Zaporizhia Oblast

Other
 Lymanske Airport